Homo duplex is a  view promulgated by Émile Durkheim, a macro-sociologist of the 19th century, saying that a man on the one hand is a biological organism, driven by instincts, with desire and appetite  and on the other hand is being led by morality and other elements generated by society. What allows a person to go beyond the "animal" nature is the most common religion that imposes specific normative system and is a way to regulate behaviour.

Left unchecked the individualism leads to a lifetime of seeking to slake selfish desires which leads to unhappiness and despair. On the other hand collective conscience serves as a check on the will. This is created by socialisation. Highly anomic societies are characterized by weak primary group ties—family, church, community, and other such groups.

Quotes
Émile Durkheim
Far from being simple, our inner life has something like a double centre of gravity. On the one hand is our individuality ... On the other is everything in us that expresses something other than ourselves. Not only are these two groups of states of consciousness different in their origins and their properties, but there is a true antagonism between them.

David Foster Wallace 
But the young educated adults of the 90s got to watch all this brave new individualism and self-expression and sexual freedom deteriorate into the joyless and anomic self-indulgence of the Me Generation. Today's sub-40s have different horrors, prominent among which are anomie and solipsism and a peculiarly American loneliness: the prospect of dying without once having loved something more than yourself.

Sigmund Freud used these ideas in his essay Civilization and Its Discontents, he wrote civilisation is created through restraint – is "built up upon a renunciation of instinct"

See also
 Homo economicus
 Homo Hierarchicus
 Names for the human species
 Suicide by Émile Durkheim.

References

 Jerzy Szacki, Durkheim, Common Knowledge, Warsaw 1964, p. 251.
 Steve Taylor, Durkheim and the Study of Suicide, Macmillan, 249 pp, July 1982, 
 Emile Durkheim and Steven Lukes, (translated by W.D. Halls), The Rules of Sociological Method and Selected Texts on Sociology and its Method,  Macmillan, 264 pp, November 1982, 

Émile Durkheim
Moral psychology